Austin Michael North (born July 30, 1996) is an American actor. He has portrayed the roles of Logan Watson in the original Disney Channel sitcom I Didn't Do It (2014–2015) and Topper Thornton in the Netflix series Outer Banks (2020–present). He was born in Cincinnati, Ohio.

Filmography

References

External links
 
 
 

1996 births
Living people
American male television actors
American stand-up comedians
21st-century American male actors
Male actors from Cincinnati
Comedians from Ohio
21st-century American comedians
American male film actors